Elias Wadih Sanbar (born 1947) is a Palestinian historian, poet, essayist, translator and diplomat. Since 2012 he has been the Palestinian ambassador to UNESCO.

Sanbar co-founded Revue d'études palestiniennes [The Journal of Palestine Studies] in 1981, and was the journal's editor-in-chief for 25 years. He has translated the poetry of Mahmoud Darwish into French.

Sanbar's book The Palestinians was the 2015 winner of the Palestine Book Awards.

References

External links
 Jordan Skinner, The Indians of Palestine: An interview between Gilles Deleuze and Elias Sanbar, Verso Books, 8 August 2014

1947 births
Living people
20th-century Palestinian historians
Palestinian essayists
Palestinian translators
Palestinian poets
Palestinian diplomats
Arabic–French translators
Permanent Delegates of Palestine to UNESCO
Palestinian male poets
Palestinian Christians
21st-century Palestinian historians